Jeremy Harper is an American entrant in the Guinness Book of World Records for counting aloud to 1,000,000, live-streaming the entire process.

The count took Harper 89 days, during each of which he spent sixteen hours counting. He began on June 18, 2007, finishing on September 14. His MillionCount website and forum were taken down some months later.

During the count, he neither left his home in Birmingham, Alabama nor shaved. Viewers could watch him live throughout. He appeared on CNN, Fox News, Cnet, and other national and local TV and radio shows.

The count raised over $10,000 for his supporting charity Push America.

In 2010, Harper, along with Geno Pearson and Jeff Clanton, founded Birmingham Mountain Radio.

References

Living people
People from Birmingham, Alabama
Year of birth missing (living people)